Siva Charan Singh (born 29 November 1993) is an Indian cricketer. He made his List A debut for Andhra in the 2016–17 Vijay Hazare Trophy on 3 March 2017. He made his first-class debut for Andhra in the 2018–19 Ranji Trophy on 12 November 2018.

References

External links
 

1993 births
Living people
Indian cricketers
Andhra cricketers
Place of birth missing (living people)